Norm Dunn (21 January 1896 – 5 July 1973) was an Australian rules footballer for  in the Victorian Football League (VFL).

He played his final VFL match in 1919 having played 14 matches.

References

External links
 
 

Essendon Football Club players
Australian rules footballers from Victoria (Australia)
1896 births
1973 deaths